Mid-luxury is a term applied in the U.S. market to fashion, vehicles, hotels, apartments, and other consumer goods and services, for brands that are not as expensive as luxury goods, but more expensive than mass market brands.

Fashion
Fashion brands identified as mid-luxury in the U.S. market include Brooks Brothers, Coach, Hugo Boss, Zac Posen, Tommy Hilfiger, and Ralph Lauren. Indochino is a manufacturer, selling mid-luxury custom-made business shirts direct to consumers.

Amazon
As of 2018, Amazon U.S. has been struggling to get luxury brands to sell on its platform, but has had success with selling its house brands, such as Pinzon (sheets and other domestics) targeted at the mid-luxury market.

Cars
"Mid-luxury" is a term equivalent to mid-size luxury cars.

References

Retailing by products and services sold
Brands
Goods (economics)